Annbank railway station was a railway station serving the villages of Annbank and Mossblown, South Ayrshire, Scotland. The station was part of the Ayr to Mauchline Branch of the Glasgow and South Western Railway.

History 
The station opened on 1 September 1870, and closed to regular passenger services on 10 September 1951. There was a line heading south from this station leading to Cumnock. There was also a line that headed north west to join the former Glasgow, Paisley, Kilmarnock and Ayr Railway just south of Monkton railway station.

Opened by the Glasgow and South Western Railway, it became part of the London, Midland and Scottish Railway during the Grouping of 1923. The station then passed on to the Scottish Region of British Railways in 1948, only surviving three years into the nationalised era before closure to passengers by British Railways.

Weston Bridge Halt railway station was located at Annbank near Ayr Colliery No.9 and was used by miners travelling to their respective collieries.

Today the Ayr to Mauchline line is still open as a freight line. The line to the south is open as far as Drongan, serving the former Killoch Colliery.

References

Notes

Sources 
 
 
 
 Annbank station on navigable O.S. map

External links

Video footage of Annbank station site

Disused railway stations in South Ayrshire
Railway stations in Great Britain opened in 1870
Railway stations in Great Britain closed in 1951
Former Glasgow and South Western Railway stations